The South Florida Bulls men's soccer team represents the University of South Florida in the sport of soccer. The Bulls currently compete in the American Athletic Conference (The American) within the National Collegiate Athletic Association (NCAA). USF plays in Corbett Stadium, which opened in 2011 and is also used by the USF women's soccer team. Prior to that, they played at USF Soccer Field from their first season in 1965 until 1978 and USF Soccer Stadium (later called USF Soccer and Track Stadium) from 1979 until 2010. They are coached by Bob Butehorn, who is in his sixth year with the Bulls as of the 2022 season.

The men's soccer team was the first team in USF history to play an intercollegiate game, defeating Florida Southern 4–3 on September 25, 1965.

Men's soccer is historically one of USF's most successful sports teams, winning a combined 27 regular season and tournament conference championships (the most of any program at the school) and reaching the NCAA Tournament 23 times. The furthest the Bulls have advanced in the tournament is to the Elite Eight, which they have reached three times.

History

Dan Holcomb Era (1965–1986) 
USF men's soccer began NCAA play in 1965 under Coach Dan Holcomb. Holcomb guided the team for 22 years, compiling a record of 216–86–23, and earning 7 NCAA tournament berths and 15 combined regular season and tournament conference titles.

Jay Miller Era (1987–1993) 
In 1987, Jay Miller took over as coach of the Bulls. In seven years, he compiled a record of 69–43–15. The Bulls entered the Sun Belt Conference in 1990, and, with a record 5–1–1 in conference play, they were named co-champions.

In 1992 and 1993 the Bulls played in the Metro Conference, compiling a conference record of 3–5–1.

Under Coach Miller, the Bulls failed to reach the NCAA Tournament.

T. Logan Fleck Era (1994–1996) 
In three seasons, Fleck compiled a record of 34–17–0. In 1994, while still in the Metro Conference, The Bulls were 9–7–0 overall, and 3–2 in conference. They moved to Conference USA in 1995, and went 8–6–0 overall, and 5–3–0 in conference play. In 1996, Fleck's final season, the Bulls won the Conference USA title, and appeared in the NCAA Tournament. Fleck, who was also the inaugural coach of the USF women's soccer team in 1995 and 1996, resigned after the 1996 season to coach the women's team full time.

David Christiansen Era (1997) 
David Christainsen, a 28-year old assistant under Coach Fleck, was hired as the interim coach of the Bulls for the 1997 season. Christiansen went 14–8–2 overall, and 5–1–2 in conference, as the team was named Conference USA co-champions. Christiansen took the team deep into NCAA Tournament, their best result up to that point, as they made it all the way to the Elite Eight. Christansen resigned after the season because of an incident on the team's flight back to Tampa following their loss to Indiana in the NCAA Tournament.

John Hackworth Era (1998–2001) 
In 1998, under Coach Hackworth, the Bulls won the conference championship for a third straight year, this time winning both the regular season and tournament Conference USA titles. The team also appeared in the NCAA tournament for the third year in a row. Hackworth compiled a record of 47–32–2 overall, and 20–13–1 in conference in four seasons.

George Kiefer Era (2002–2016) 
In 2002, George Kiefer took over as coach. In 2004, the Bulls jumped from Conference USA to the Big East, and in 2013 the Big East transitioned to the American Athletic Conference. The Bulls won the Big East regular season title in 2005 and 2011, the Big East tournament in 2008, the inaugural AAC Tournament in 2013, and the AAC regular season title in 2016. Under Coach Keifer, the Bulls found themselves in 10 NCAA Tournaments, including seven straight (2007–2013). They reached the Elite Eight in 2008 and 2011. In 2011, the Bulls moved from the USF Soccer and Track Stadium to the new Corbett Stadium. 

Keifer had a record of 162–84–47 with the Bulls. On November 22, 2016, Kiefer was hired by the NC State Wolfpack men's soccer program.

Bob Butehorn Era (2017–present) 

On December 18, 2016, Bob Butehorn was hired as the head coach for the program. Butehorn previously coached the Florida Gulf Coast Eagles men's soccer program. The Bulls made the NCAA tournament in 2019. After a few disappointing seasons, the Bulls made the conference tournament championship game in 2022 and made the NCAA tournament for the second time under Butehorn's guide, and won a tournament game for the first time since 2012 after a 4–2 victory against Hofstra at Corbett Stadium, and lost in the second round to No. 1 overall seed Kentucky.

Roster 
As of October 17, 2020

Coaching Staff
  Bob Butehorn – Head Coach
  Jeremy Hurdle – Assistant Coach
  Matt Poplawski – Assistant Coach
  Tom Homa – Director of Operations
  Tomas Cerda – Volunteer Assistant Coach
  Chris Murphy – Assistant Strength & Conditioning Coach
  Octavio Tobar – Assistant Athletic Trainer

Fans 
The main group of student supporters are known as the Goalmouths. They sit on the berm behind whichever goal USF is attacking in that particular half.

Rivalries 

USF's main rival is American Athletic Conference foe Central Florida, with whom they compete in the War on I-4.

The Bulls annually face the crosstown University of Tampa Spartans, an NCAA Division II school, in the preseason Rowdies Cup, which celebrates the city's rich soccer history. The Bulls have a deep connection with the Rowdies, as Corbett Stadium is named after USF alumni and former Rowdies owners (of the original club, not the current one) Dick and Cornelia Corbett. In addition to holding the match trophy until the next match, the winners also get to hoist the actual 1975 Soccer Bowl trophy, which was won by the original Tampa Bay Rowdies. Formerly called the Mayor's Cup until 2005, as of the 2022 edition, USF holds  edge in the all-time series which dates back to 1972.

Season-by-season results 

*- indicates season in progress, totals will be updated at end of season

NCAA tournament results

Individual honors

Hermann Trophy finalists 

  Fergus Hopper, 1977

All Americans

First team 

  Roy Wegerle, 1982, 1983
  Mike Mekelburg, 1996
  Jeff Attinella, 2009

Second team 

  Fergus Hopper, 1975
  Dom Dwyer, 2011

Third team 

  Jeff Cunningham, 1996, 1997
  Yohance Marshall, 2008
  Nazeem Bartman, 2015

Conference honors

Player of the decade 

 Jeff Cunningham, 1990s

Player of the year 

 Tim Geltz, 1991
 Mark Chung, 1992
 Mike Mekleberg, 1996
 Jeff Cunningham, 1997
 Brian Waltrip, 1998
 Dom Dwyer, 2011
 Prosper Figbe, 2016

Goalkeeper of the year 

 Jeff Attinella, 2009
 Spasoje Stefanovic, 2014, 2016

First team all conference 

 Ralph Baker, 1977, 1979
 Fran Lemmons, 1977
 Declan O’Donoghue, 1977, 1978
 Harry Jean-Charles, 1977
 Kyle White, 1978, 1979, 1980, 1981
 Shay Smith, 1978
 Paul Ritter, 1979
 Jesper Pederson, 1979
 Dan Peterson, 1980
 Mike Metzner, 1980
 Nigel Armorer-Clarke, 1980, 1981
 Bob Bauman, 1980
 Hisham Ramzi, 1981
 Jim Peterson, 1981
 Jay White, 1981, 1982
 Roy Wegerle, 1982, 1983
 Johann Westerhorstmann, 1982, 1984
 Ranier Kuhn, 1982
 Garnett Craig, 1982
 Kelvin Jones, 1983, 1984
 Aris Bogdaneris, 1984, 1985, 1986
 Ray Perlee, 1984, 1985, 1986
 Alan Anderson, 1984, 1986, 1987
 David Dodge, 1985
 Giles Hooper, 1987
 Michael Bates, 1988
 Mark Chung, 1989, 1990, 1992
 R.C. Campagnolo, 1989, 1990
 Tim Geltz, 1991
 Ed Carmean, 1991
 Mike Borgard, 1992, 1993, 1994
 Andy Restrepo, 1992
 Jeff Gopsill, 1992
 Oystein Drillestad, 1992, 1993, 1994
 Jeff Cunningham, 1994, 1995, 1996, 1997
 Mike Mekelburg, 1994, 1996
 Harold Ooft, 1994
 Todd Denault, 1996
 Brian Waltrip, 1997, 1998
 Brian Alvero, 1998, 1999
 Kevin Alvero, 1998, 1999
 Jeff Houser, 1998
 Jason Cudjoe, 2001
 Jeff Thwaites, 2001, 2002
 Hunter West, 2002
 Kareem Smith, 2004
 Rodrigo Hidalgo, 2005
 Kevon Neaves, 2007, 2008
 Yohance Marshall, 2008
 Jeff Attinella, 2009
 Dom Dwyer, 2011
 Ben Sweat, 2013
 Lucas Baldin, 2014
 Lindo Mfeka, 2014, 2015, 2016
 Wesley Charpie, 2014
 Spasoje Stefanovic, 2014, 2016
 Nazeem Bartman, 2015, 2016
 Brendan Hines-Ike, 2015
 Prosper Figbe, 2016
 Adrian Billhardt, 2017
 Ricardo Gomez, 2017
 Tomasz Skublak, 2018
 Javain Brown, 2019
 Avionne Flanagan, 2019

Coach of the year 

 Dan Holcomb, 1976, 1980
 John Hackworth, 1998

USF Athletic Hall of Fame members 

  Dan Holcomb – Head Coach 1965–86
  Fergus Hopper – DF 1974–77
 Matthew O'Neal – FW 2013–14*
*Two sport athlete, mainly inducted for his performance with USF's Track and Field team.

Players who went on to play professionally 
 Bernardo Añor, professional footballer for Sporting Kansas City, currently on loan to Minnesota United FC
 Jeff Attinella, professional footballer for the Portland Timbers.
 Lucas Baldin, professional footballer for Deportivo Lara.
 Tyler Blackwood, professional footballer for Oakland Roots.
 Peter Chandler, veteran of USMNT, played professionally in the original NASL.
 Wesley Charpie, professional footballer for Louisville City FC.
 Mark Chung, veteran of USMNT, played professionally in MLS for 10 years.
 Jeff Cunningham, veteran of USMNT, played professionally in MLS for 15 years.
 Dom Dwyer, professional footballer who most recently played for Toronto FC and has also played for the USMNT.
 Kevin Eagan, played professionally in the original NASL.
 Tom Fitzgerald, NCAA winning soccer coach and MLS coach.
 Brendan Hines-Ike, professional footballer for D.C. United.
 Dallas Jaye, professional footballer for Greenville Triumph & Guam national football team.
 Yohance Marshall, professional footballer who most recently played for Icelandic club Kórdrengir.
 Nikola Paunic, professional footballer for Orange County Blues FC.
 Troy Perkins, veteran of USMNT, played professionally in MLS for 10 years.
  Diego Restrepo, professional footballer for Austin Bold FC.
 Neven Subotić, professional footballer for SCR Altach.
 Ben Sweat, record appearance holder for South Florida Men's soccer, professional footballer for New York City FC.
 Roy Wegerle, veteran of 1994 and 1998 World Cup for USMNT, played professionally in the original NASL, EPL and MLS.
 Anthony Wallace, capped once by the USMNT, plays professionally for OKC Energy FC.

Media 
Under the current American Athletic Conference TV deal, all home and in-conference away men's soccer games are shown on one of the various ESPN networks or streamed live on ESPN+. Live radio broadcasts of games are also available nationwide for free on the Bulls Unlimited digital radio station on TuneIn.

See also 
 South Florida Bulls women's soccer
South Florida Bulls
 University of South Florida

References

External links 
 

 
Soccer clubs in Florida
1965 establishments in Florida
Association football clubs established in 1965